Buckskin Glacier is a glacier in Denali National Park and Preserve in the U.S. state of Alaska. The glacier originates on the east side of The Moose's Tooth, flowing east, then southeast, for  before giving rise to the Hidden River.

See also
 List of glaciers

References

Glaciers of Matanuska-Susitna Borough, Alaska
Glaciers of Denali National Park and Preserve
Glaciers of Alaska